Russell Dickson (born 30 March 1961) is a former Australian rules footballer who played with Melbourne in the Victorian Football League (VFL).

Notes

External links 

1961 births
Living people
Australian rules footballers from Victoria (Australia)
Melbourne Football Club players